Ainley is a surname. Notable people with the surname include:

Anthony Ainley (1932–2004), English actor
Henry Ainley (1879–1945), English Shakespearean stage and screen actor
Joe Ainley (1878–1907), English cricketer
John A. Ainley Jr. (1938–2001), American politician
Richard Ainley (1910–1967), stage and film actor

See also
Ainley Peak
Ainley Top
Ainsley, a surname